The Commonwealth Railways NM class locomotive was a class of 4-8-0 locomotives of the Commonwealth Railways, Australia.  The class operated on  narrow gauge lines in South Australia and the Northern Territory.

History
Between June 1925 and December 1927, the Commonwealth Railways took delivery of 22 locomotives built to the same design as the Queensland Railways C17 class for use on the Central Australian Railway, but with larger tenders and vacuum rather than air brakes. All were built by Thompson & Co, Castlemaine.

The final locomotive was despatched to the North Australia Railway, returning south in September 1941.

Eighteen were converted to burn oil during the 1949 coal strike, being converted back to coal burning after the strike ended. All were withdrawn between 1954 and 1956 as the NSU diesel locomotives entered service.

Two have been preserved, NM25 in operational condition at the Pichi Richi Railway and NM34 at the National Railway Museum, Port Adelaide.

References

Notes

Bibliography

External links

NM class
Railway locomotives introduced in 1925
4-8-0 locomotives
3 ft 6 in gauge locomotives of Australia
Freight locomotives